The 1965 Cape Verdean Football Championship consisted only a single match featuring the winners from Santiago Island and São Vicente.  At the time it was not a national but a provincial or a colonial event, it was also known as the 1965 Cape Verdean Provincial (rarely Colonial) Football Championship.  Unlike other overseas provinces of the Portuguese Empire, neither club qualified into the 1964-65 Portuguese Cup at four rounds before the finals, that was the last time, the next edition would bring the only club to the Portuguese Cup edition, the next time that neither club qualified into the Portuguese Cup would be in 1967. Académica da Praia won their only Cape Verdean title for the season. It was their only Cape Verdean title for 53 years, their next would be a national title (as the archipelago became an independent nation in 1975) won on June 2, 2018.

The finals were broadcast on Rádio Praia, at the time Cape Verde's only radio station.

Background
Académica da Praia, winner of the Santiago Island Championships for 1965 would face against FC Derby from Mindelo, winner of the São Vicente Island Championships for 1965.

The match was Académica Praia's only time into the provincials as a finals match.  On the other, the match was Derby's first ever into the Cape Verdean level and the only time in the provincial era.

Match details
FC Derby scored some goals.  Académica Praia scored two goals in the first part of the match, they were Nhartanga and Luís Bastos, the latter scored it at the last two matches of regulation and tied it with two each.  The match went into extra time, Luís Bastos scored his second goal totalling three and brought Académica Praia to win their only Cape Verdean and provincial title for the season.

{| width="100%"
|valign="top" width="50%"|

See also
1965 in Cape Verde

References

External links
Official website of Académica da Praia - which includes the historic 1965 match 
1965 Cape Verdean Football Championship match at Sports Mídia

Cape Verdean Football Championship seasons
1965 in Cape Verde
1965 in the Portuguese Empire
Académica da Praia
FC Derby